The 1896–1897 Penn State Nittany Lions basketball team represented Penn State University during the 1896–97 college men's basketball season.

Schedule

|-

References

Penn State Nittany Lions basketball seasons
Penn State Nittany Lions Basketball Team
Penn State Nittany Lions Basketball Team
Penn State